"Blue" is a song by American rock band A Perfect Circle. It was the third single from the band's second studio album, Thirteenth Step, behind the releases of the singles "Weak and Powerless" and "The Outsider". While not as successful as the prior two singles, which crossed over into the Billboard Hot 100 charts and hit the top 5 of the Mainstream Rock charts, the song was still a moderate success, peaking at number 19 on the latter chart. A remix version, "Blue (Bird Shake mix)", was created by guitarist James Iha and released on the band's compilation album Amotion as well, and also received radio airplay.

Writing and recording
After the release of the band's first album, Mer de Noms, lead singer Maynard James Keenan returned to his other band, Tool in late 2000. While Keenan and guitarist Billy Howerdel had originally planned on working on material for a second album, which would become Thirteenth Step, while he was on the road with Tool. However, Keenan found it difficult to try to juggle two bands at once, instead leaving Howerdel to work on the album with the rest of the band across 2001 and 2002. The song originates from Howerdel's early sessions for the album, being written shortly after seeing the effects of the 9/11 attacks in September 2001. Influenced by the dark scenes, Howerdel wrote thinking of themes of "escape" and "fearing the worst". The song's first iteration was written and recorded all in one take by Howerdel with a bass guitar, under the working title of "Red". After Keenan reconvened with the band for the album's final recording sessions over the first half of 2003, tension occurred between Keenan and Howerdel, due to Keenan wanting to rearrange and mellow out many of Howerdel's early sessions recordings such as "Blue". During this time, the song was given lyrics by Keenan, who tied its meaning more into the Thirteenth Step'''s concept of addiction and recovery, with the lyrics being about having to confront the aftermath of a person overdosing on drugs, especially heroin usage. Allegory in the lyrics refer to respiratory depression, resulting in features turning blue from a lack of oxygen, somnolence (referred to as 'nodding' by recreational users), and euphoria.

Release and alternate versions
Keenan and Howerdel also clashed on its release as a single; Howerdel preferred releasing The Outsider as a single first, while Keenan preferred releasing "Blue" first. Howerdel persevered in this instance, with "The Outsider" being released as the second single, and "Blue" being released as the third single on July 27, 2004. The band held a contest for fans in creating the music video, challenging them to create the most "creative, arresting, and imaginative" video for the album. The contest was won by Joseph Perez, and his version, along with the three runner-up entries, were included on the band's compilation CD/DVD release Amotion in November 2004. An electronic remix of the song done by guitarist James Iha, who had not performed on the album version of the song, having not joined the band yet, was released on the CD side of Amotion'' release, and also received radio airplay.

Reception
The single was generally well received critically and commercially. Team Rock ranked the song as the band's fourth best of all time in 2010, praising the song's duality, stating "Listen while half-distracted and you’ve got a pleasant melody that embeds itself in your brain; pay full attention, and it’s full of APC’s trademark creepiness." Artist Direct also placed it in their group of top ten A Perfect Circle songs, praising it for "Keenan's signature croon makes for one of the group's most melodic and majestic ruminations" and "Howerdel's playing feels downright cinematic as everything collides on that sinisterly sweet hook." AllMusic highlighted it as one of the songs that best illustrated the band's newer, more mellow and atmospheric sound on the album, and stating that it "features a kind of barely restrained menace caught in a trap by rock & roll vulnerability". While the single was not as popular as the prior two from the album, "Weak and Powerless" and "The Outsider", which charted at number 1 and 5 on the Mainstream Rock chart, it still managed to peak at number 19.

Track listing

Charts

References

A Perfect Circle songs
2003 songs
2004 singles
Songs about heroin
Songs written by Maynard James Keenan
Songs written by Billy Howerdel
Virgin Records singles